Aisén River, also spelled Aysén, is a river of Chile located in the Aysén del General Carlos Ibáñez del Campo Region. The Aisén begins at the confluence of the Simpson River and the Mañiguales River.

Puerto Aisén is located close to its mouth.

References

External links
 Cuenca del rio Aysén

Rivers of Aysén Region
Rivers of Chile